The Tecnam P2004 Bravo is a high-wing, light aircraft built by the Tecnam aircraft company. It is similar to the Tecnam P92 Echo Super, but has a cantilevered wing rather than the P92's strut-braced wing.

Specifications (P2004 Bravo)

See also

References

Tecnam aircraft
2000s Italian civil utility aircraft
Single-engined tractor aircraft
High-wing aircraft
Aircraft first flown in 2002